The AN/WQX-2 is a diver detection sonar used in defense against swimmer incursions. It is in service with the  US Navy. It uses Kongsberg Mesotech components.

The AN/WQX-2 finds range and bearing of the detected target relative to the sonar. The C3D console developed by SPAWAR converts this to a GPS position. It has software to distinguish diver echoes from shoals of fish, marine mammals, debris, bubbles from boat wakes, etc.

External links
Non-Lethal Swimmer Neutralization Study (about 3 megabytes)(page 3)
National Defense Industrial Association: .ppt presentation of 42 slides, 11 MB: look for "SDS".
C R&T Waterfront Physical Security
Update info for ditto
Coast Guard’s Underwater Port Security (archive)

Diver-detector sonars
Military sonar equipment of the United States